Ralf Geilenkirchen (born 26 April 1966) is a German former professional footballer who played as a midfielder.

Club career
Geilenkirchen played four years for 1. FC Köln, being coached under Hannes Löhr, Georg Keßler and Christoph Daum. He participated in the 1986 UEFA Cup Final, scoring a goal in the 72nd minute of the second leg.

References

External links
 
 Ralf Geilenkirchen at FC Antwerp 

Living people
1966 births
Sportspeople from Aachen
German footballers
Footballers from North Rhine-Westphalia
Association football midfielders
Bundesliga players
2. Bundesliga players
1. FC Köln players
1. FC Köln II players
Royal Antwerp F.C. players
FC Viktoria Köln players
Eintracht Braunschweig players
KFC Uerdingen 05 players
West German expatriate footballers
West German expatriate sportspeople in Belgium
Expatriate footballers in Belgium
West German footballers